Yekaterina Kibalo (born 18 March 1982) is a Russian swimmer. She competed at the 2000 Summer Olympics in the 50 m, 100 m and 4×100 m freestyle events and finished in 33rd, 20th and 10th place, respectively.

References

External links
Ekaterina KIBALO. les-sports.info
Ekaterina Kibalo (RUS). i-swimmer.ru

1982 births
Living people
Olympic swimmers of Russia
Swimmers at the 2000 Summer Olympics
Russian female freestyle swimmers
Russian female swimmers
Sportspeople from Krasnodar